Mool may refer to:

Surname
 Karl Mööl (born 1992), Estonian football player
 Mux Mool, American musician and artist

Given name
 Mool Chand Chowhan (1927–2009), Indian sports official
 Mool Chand Daga, Indian politician
 Mool Chand Jain (1915–1997)
 Mool Chand Meena (1992-2006)
 Mool Chand Sharma
 Mool Singh (1947–2016), Indian politician